The Abyss: Incident at Europa is a 1998 adventure video game by Sound Source Interactive, based on James Cameron's 1989 science fiction film The Abyss.

Adobe Photoshop was used to touch up graphic assets.

The game, set six years after the film, is a real-time adventure game played from the first person perspective.

Retro Gaming Magazine suggested "the game’s not as terrible as many people make it out to be". PC Joker gave the game a rating of 39% and GamesMania gave it 40%. PC Gamer said "the level of frustration will quickly turn off a lot of inexperienced gamers." Just Adventure felt the level of shooting was too little for action fans but too much for adventure fans. The AV Vault felt it had "dated, blocky graphics [and] low production values".

CD-Action wrote "The Abyss is second to none and will surprise you with its fineness". Power Play Magazine thought the game was enriched by "unusual" puzzles and action elements.

References 

1998 video games
Adventure games
Science fiction video games
Video games based on films
Video games developed in the United States
Video games with underwater settings
Windows games
Windows-only games